The 1974 Auckland City mayoral election was part of the New Zealand local elections held that same year. In 1974, elections were held for the Mayor of Auckland plus other local government positions including twenty-one city councillors. The polling was conducted using the standard first-past-the-post electoral method.

Background
Incumbent Mayor Dove-Myer Robinson was re-elected seeing off a challenge from Labour Party candidate Jim Anderton, who won a seat on the council despite losing the mayoralty. Grahame Sims, the retiring town clerk, ran for mayor and accused Robinson of being a Citizens & Ratepayers stooge. This followed the C&R deputy mayor Lindo Ferguson endorsing Robinson for the mayoralty. Sims called it "seat warming", insinuating Ferguson would run for mayor at the next election.

Mayoralty results

Councillor results

Notes

References

Mayoral elections in Auckland
1974 elections in New Zealand
Politics of the Auckland Region
1970s in Auckland
October 1974 events in New Zealand